Don Henderson (born September 23, 1968) is a Canadian National Hockey League linesman, who wears uniform number #91. He began officiating NHL games in 1994 and has worked more than 1,300 games including the Stanley Cup Playoffs. He is the younger brother of Archie Henderson.

Henderson has not officiated since sustaining a serious concussion after a check from Calgary Flames player Dennis Wideman in a game on January 27, 2016.  Despite the injury, Henderson was able to finish the game, but developed concussion symptoms and back and neck pain in the following days. Wideman was initially suspended for 20 games by the league for deliberate physical abuse of an official, but an independent arbitrator concluded the check to be unintentional and reduced the suspension to 10 games.

References

1968 births
Ice hockey people from Calgary
Living people
National Hockey League officials
Canadian ice hockey officials